Joseph Charles Mardrus, otherwise known as "Jean-Charles Mardrus" (1868–1949), was a French physician, poet, and a noted translator. Today he is best known for his translation of the Thousand and One Nights from Arabic into French, which was published from 1898 to 1904, and was in turn rendered into English by Edward Powys Mathers. A newer edition, Le livre des mille nuits et une nuit, was published in 1926–1932.

Mardrus's version of the Arabian Nights is mentioned explicitly in the pages of Marcel Proust's Remembrance of Things Past.  Mardrus was an Orientalist and inserted a lot of material of his own, and his translation is therefore not wholly authentic. Much of the homosexual material for example, is an absolute invention of Mardrus himself, and so confuses the issue of actual homosexuality in the Nights, of which there is a substantial amount. Mardrus claimed that his translation was based on a previously unknown "Tunisian text",  but this fictional manuscript was never seen by anyone else.

Biography 
Mardrus was born in Cairo, Egypt in 1868 to a Catholic family of Armenian-descent, and studied in Lebanon before settling in Paris, France.

As a doctor for the French government, he worked throughout Morocco and the Far East. He produced other translations, some illustrated by the Swiss engraver François-Louis Schmied (1873–1941). He married the novelist and poet Lucie Delarue-Mardrus on 5 June 1900. In 1914 he met Gabrielle Bralant ("Cobrette"), whom he would later marry, and he and Lucie separated in the following year; Lucie in any case had lesbian inclinations.

Elvira Buder (born 1918) claimed to have travelled from Egypt via Greece with Mardrus in the 1930s with the intention of attending the Sorbonne. Soon after arriving in Paris war broke out and she found herself pregnant and in France on an Italian passport. Buder left France for Italy when the Germans occupied Paris, although she claimed that Mardrus was not the father of her child. Much later they met for the last time when Buder had just married E.W.N. Mallows, son of C.E. Mallows Charles Edward Mallows. Mardrus was a friend of Louis Aragon and introduced Buder to him.

Works
 Les Mille et Une Nuits (The 1001 Nights, edited by Robert Laffont; in the Bouquins collection)
 L’Apocalypse qui est la révélation 
 Le Livre des Morts de l’Ancienne Égypte 
 Le Cantique des Cantiques
 Le Livre des Rois
 Sucre d’amour (1926), illustrated by François-Louis Schmied
 La Reine de Saba (1918)
 La Reine de Saba et divers autres contes (1921)
 Le Koran, commissioned by the French government in 1925
 Le Paradis musulman (1930), illustrated by François-Louis Schmied
 Toute-Puissance de l'Adepte  (Le Livre de la Vérité de Parole) 1932

References

1868 births
1949 deaths
Arabic–French translators
Translators from Arabic
Mardrus, JC
Translators of One Thousand and One Nights
Writers from Cairo
Armenian orientalists
19th-century French writers